Children of the Thunder is a 1988 science fiction novel by John Brunner.

References

1988 British novels
1988 science fiction novels
Novels by John Brunner
Environmental fiction books
Del Rey books